Nocturnality describes sleeping during the daytime and being active at night.

Nocturnal(s) may also refer to:

Music

Classical compositions
Nocturnal (Varèse), a 1961 work for voice and orchestra by Edgard Varèse
Nocturnal after John Dowland, a 1963 work for solo guitar by Benjamin Britten

Performers
Knoc-turn'al (born 1975), American rapper
Nokturnl, an Australian rap metal band

Albums
Nocturnal (Amaral album) or the title song, 2015
Nocturnal (The Black Dahlia Murder album) or the title song, 2007
Nocturnal (Heltah Skeltah album), 1996
Nocturnal (Yuna album), 2013
Nocturnal, EP by Prozak, 2012
Nocturnal (Roy Woods EP), 2016
Nocturnal, by Florian-Ayala Fauna, 2012

Songs
"Nocturnal" (song), by Disclosure, 2016
"Nocturnal", by House of Large Sizes from My Ass-Kicking Life, 1994

Other uses
Nocturnal (instrument), a device for determining time from the position of stars
Nocturnal (novel), a 2007 podcast and 2012 novel by Scott Sigler
Nocturnals, a comics series by Dan Brereton
Nocturnal sect, a category in astrology of sect

See also
Night owl (person), a person who tends to stay up until late at night